Orocrambus ventosus is a moth in the family Crambidae. It was described by Edward Meyrick in 1920. The species is endemic to New Zealand, where it has been recorded in the Tasman Mountains and at Mount Owen. Its preferred habitat is alpine grasslands.

Description

The wingspan is 25–31 mm. Adults have been recorded on wing from December to February.

References

Crambinae
Moths described in 1920
Moths of New Zealand
Endemic fauna of New Zealand
Taxa named by Edward Meyrick
Endemic moths of New Zealand